Kheyt-e Amareh (also Romanized as Kheyţ-e ‘Amāreh and Kheyţ-e ‘Emāreh; also known as Kheyţ ol ‘Amāreh) is a village in Chah Salem Rural District, in the Central District of Omidiyeh County, Khuzestan Province, Iran. At the 2006 census, its population was 528, in 88 families.

References 

Populated places in Omidiyeh County